Ranjith Jinatissa Aluwihare (born May 5, 1958) is a Sri Lankan politician. He is a representative of Matale District for the United National Party in the Parliament of Sri Lanka. He is also the most senior member of the parliament for the United National Party from the Matale District. He is currently the Hon. State Minister of Tourism. He resides in Matale, Aluvihare. He is the son of Alick Aluwihare and brother of Wasantha Aluwihare.

See also
List of political families in Sri Lanka

References

Sinhalese businesspeople
1958 births
Living people
Sri Lankan Buddhists
Members of the 11th Parliament of Sri Lanka
Members of the 12th Parliament of Sri Lanka
Members of the 13th Parliament of Sri Lanka
Members of the 15th Parliament of Sri Lanka
United National Party politicians